Kangar Bypass, or Jalan Padang Behor - Guar Syed Alwi, Federal Route 186, is a federal road bypass in Kangar, Perlis, Malaysia. The Kilometre Zero of the Federal Route 186 starts at Taman Desa Sentua junctions.

Features

Federal Route 186 was built under the JKR R5 road standard, allowing a maximum speed limit of 90 km/h.

List of junctions and towns

References

Malaysian Federal Roads
Highways in Malaysia
Roads in Perlis